Bethpage State Park is a  New York state park on the border of Nassau County and Suffolk County on Long Island. The park contains tennis courts, picnic and recreational areas and a polo field, but is best known for its five golf courses, including the Bethpage Black Course, which hosted the 2002 and 2009 U.S. Open Golf Championships and the 2019 PGA Championship.

History
In 1912, Benjamin Franklin Yoakum, a wealthy railroad executive, acquired  of land
in what is now known as Old Bethpage, NY, a hamlet adjacent to the Village of Farmingdale. Yoakum hired Devereux Emmet to design and build an 18-hole golf course on the land, which opened for play in 1923, and which Yoakum leased to the private Lenox Hills Country Club.
At this time part of Youkum's estate was subdivided for residential use. This is the Old Lenox Hills neighborhood of Farmingdale Village.

When Yoakum died in 1929, there was conflict over usage of the leased lands. The State of New York, under the auspices of the Long Island State Park Commission, expressed interest in obtaining the lands, and purchased an option on the property in 1931. New York was able to assume management of the Lenox Hills Country Club through a lease agreement with the private owners in 1932, however Bethpage State Park was not officially purchased by the state until May 1934. Jesse Merritt of Farmingdale, Nassau County Historian, had convinced Robert Moses to name the park "Bethpage State Park" after the  tract of land purchased by his ancestor Thomas Powell in 1695 from three Native American tribes.

The original golf course became the Green Course; by 1936, three more courses opened, designed by A. W. Tillinghast under contract to the Park Commission; a fifth (the Yellow Course) was designed by Alfred Tull (formerly a business partner of Emmet), and opened in 1958. The park has picnic facilities, bridle paths, playing fields, a polo field, tennis courts, cross-country skiing trails, and hiking and biking trails including one leading south to Massapequa, but it is best known for its golf facilities.

Bethpage State Park also has a four kilometer and five kilometer cross country course.

Geography 
The park is not located in Bethpage as its name suggests, but actually located almost entirely within the hamlet of Old Bethpage. However, since at the time there was no Old Bethpage post office, it used a Farmingdale address instead, and continues to use one to this day. The clubhouse is located next to Lenox Hills and is within the Farmingdale School District.
The Green course is adjacent to the Lenox Hills area, while the Yellow Course is adjacent to the part of Lenox Hills within Farmingdale Village and the part of Lenox Hills, unincorporated Farmingdale, just west of it along Merritts Road toward Bethpage. The Black Course is adjacent to the exclusive Melville Court development in East Farmingdale and the Old Bethpage industrial area. The Red Course is adjacent to Old Bethpage residential neighborhoods, while the Blue Course is closer to the community of Bethpage (formerly Central Park, pre-1936).

Bethpage State Park's name reflects the locality names that existed at the time of its creation. Old Bethpage was known as Bethpage prior to 1936, when the adjacent hamlet of Central Park changed its name to Bethpage. Following this name change, the hamlet originally called Bethpage resisted suggestions that it merge with the new Bethpage, and got approval from the post office to change its name to Old Bethpage, though it did not have its own post office until 1965. The parcel of the Quaker Bethpage Friends Meeting House, across from the Park entrance, is within Old Bethpage hamlet boundaries, but abuts residences within the Lenox Hills area of Farmingdale Village. These specific border circumstances clarify that the park has close ties to Farmingdale.

Golf

The park has five eighteen-hole golf courses, named (in increasing order of difficulty) the Yellow, Green, Blue, Red, and Black Courses. In 2002 the Black Course became the first publicly owned and operated course to host the U.S. Open. The tournament was won by Tiger Woods, being the only golfer to score under par for the tournament. The Tournament was seen as one of the most difficult and exciting U.S. Opens in history, breaking attendance records and creating a boisterous atmosphere for the U.S. Open. Bethpage Black also hosted the 2009 U.S. Open, which was won by Lucas Glover.

Prior to 2002, all U.S. Opens had been staged at private golf or country clubs or at privately owned resorts that, while open to the public, were very expensive for the public to play, with greens fees of several hundred dollars per round. The USGA's choice of Bethpage was seen as an egalitarian move; as of 2010, Bethpage Black's weekend price for 18 holes was $75 for New York State residents, and $150 for non-residents. There are a number of ways for golfers to secure a round on the always popular Black Course. To register for a tee time, guests must have their driver's license on file with the park's reservation system. Note that New York residents can reserve a tee time seven days in advance, while out-of-state residents can only reserve tee times starting at 7:00 pm Eastern Time two days before the intended date of play. Walk-ups are also accepted. Commonly, golfers wait in line in the parking lot overnight to secure walk-up tee times.

The logo for the entire golf complex is a profile of a boy caddie carrying a golf bag with two golf clubs sticking up from it. It is based on the images carved into the black exterior window shutters on its clubhouse.

Rankings

In its July 2008 list of America's greatest golf courses, Golf Digest ranked Bethpage Black #26 overall, #6 in the state of New York, #6 of America's 50 toughest courses, and #5 in its list of America's greatest public golf courses. It is also the top-ranked course in the Golf Digest list that is operated by a governmental entity. The PGA lists Bethpage Black as one of the "World's Most Beautiful Courses".

Major championships

PGA Tour events hosted

Future events

Polo
 
The Polo Grounds at Bethpage State Park offers a  field with bleacher seating. The field was built in 1934 and has seen both high and medium goal polo. "Polo at the Park" is hosted by Country Farms Polo Club every Sunday from June through September. The 1994 U.S. Open Polo Championship was hosted by the Meadowbrook Polo Club and the finals were played at Bethpage State Park.

See also
 List of New York state parks

References

External links

 New York State Parks: Bethpage State Park
 LongIslandGolfNews.com: Bethpage State Park Golf
 Golf Club Atlas: Bethpage Black Course
 NY-NJTC: Bethpage State Park Trail Info
 Polo at the Park

Bethpage, New York
Old Bethpage, New York
Golf clubs and courses in New York (state)
State parks of New York (state)
Robert Moses projects
Sports venues in Long Island
Golf clubs and courses designed by A. W. Tillinghast
Golf clubs and courses designed by Devereux Emmet
Parks in Nassau County, New York
Parks in Suffolk County, New York
Urban public parks
Works Progress Administration in New York (state)
1934 establishments in New York (state)
Protected areas established in 1934
Sports venues completed in 1934